Namchi is a city and the administrative headquarter of the Namchi district in the Indian state of Sikkim. The appellation Namchi means Sky (Nam) High (Chi) in Sikkimese.

Geography 

Namchi is situated at an altitude of 1,675 m (5500 feet) above sea level. Namchi lies off the road between Melli and Jorethang. Namchi is well connected to other towns in Sikkim and West Bengal. Jeeps and buses regularly ply between Namchi to Gangtok, Pelling, Jorethang, Kalimpong and Siliguri.

It is home of the Buxa Formation of Mamley, the stromatolite bearing Dolomite Limestones, which has been declared national geological monument by the Geological Survey of India (GSI), for their protection, maintenance, promotion and enhancement of geotourism.

Mamley national geological monument

Buxa Formation of Mamley (also called Mamley Stromatolite Park) in Mamley, the stromatolite bearing Dolomite Limestones has been declared national geological monument by the Geological Survey of India (GSI), for their protection, maintenance, promotion and enhancement of geotourism. It is contiguous to the Buxa Tiger Reserve in neighboring state of West Bengal.

Demographics 

As of the 2011 Census of India, Namchi has a population of 12194. Males constitute 52% of the population and females 48%. Namchi has an average literacy rate of 78%, higher than the national average of 59.5%: male literacy is 81%, and female literacy is 73%. In Namchi, 9% of the population is under 6 years of age.

Most of the people of Namchi are Hindus and Buddhists. Languages spoken are Sikkimese, Nepali.

Education 
Namchi has more than half a dozen private schools with quality education (Seven Hills School, Mt. Carmel School, Namchi Public School, Tendong Educational Institute, New Light Academy, Bethany School etc.) and government higher secondary schools for boys and girls and prominent computer institutes e.g. Informatics Computer Institute (under Government of Sikkim Registered) Multimedia Computer Institute an authorized study center of Manipal Group etc. Just few kilometers away from the town is a reputed Government College for Arts, Education, Science, Commerce. People give a lot of importance and focus on education with a reverence. Namchi Public School, run by Catholic  missionaries, is one of the respected educational institutes in the state and one of the best in the south district of Sikkim.

Tourism 

Namchi is fast becoming a tourist spot and pilgrimage centre. The Namchi Monastery, Ralang Monastery and Tendong Hill are local Buddhist pilgrimage centres. The world's largest statue (at 118 feet) of the Buddhist Padmasambhava, also known as Guru Rinpoche, the patron saint of Sikkim, is on the Samdruptse hill (The Wish Fulfilling hill) opposite Namchi. It was completed in February 2004. It is also said that the Samdruptse hill is actually a dormant volcano. Myths say that the Buddhist monks have been going on top of the hill and offering prayers to the volcano to keep it calm. There is also a Rock Garden a few kilometers from the town on the way to Samdruptse. The area has views of Mt. Kanchendzonga, aka Mt. Kangchenjunga, the world's third highest peak.  

Recently inaugurated (in November 2011), the Siddhesvara Dhaam is a pilgrimage-tourism venture of the Sikkim Government developed as "Pilgrim cum Cultural Centre" boasting an 87-ft statue of Lord Shiva and replicas of four Dhams of the country, all at one place on the Solophok hilltop in Namchi. Char Dham, the four most revered Dhams of the Hindus have been replicated in this fantastic complex to benefit the devotees and tourists. The dream project of Chief Minister Pawan Chamling which was conceived by him and started in the year 2005 stands promisingly amidst the breathtaking surrounding of Solophok hill, befitting the mythological setting behind the establishment of the original Dhams. For the consecration of the Dham Shri Jagadguru Sankaryacharya Swami Swarupananda Saraswati, in the presence of the Chief Minister Shri Pawan Chamling and his wife Smt Tika Maya Chamling, did the "Pran Prastisha" of the Dham.

There are replicas of the "Dwadash Jyotirlingas" (the twelve jyothirlingas) of Somnath, Mallikarjuna, Mahakaleswar, Omkareshwar, Kedarnath, Bhimashankar, Kashi Vishwanath, Trimbakeshwar, Vaidyanath, Nageshvara, Rameswar at Rameswaram and Grishneshwar surrounding the statue of Lord Shiva and the Char Dhams. There is a grand statue of Kirateshwar Mahadev and a temple of Shirdi Sai Baba too. One can have a view of the Mt Kanchenjunga, Statue of Guru Padmasambhava at Samdruptse, Darjeeling and other such locations from here. The Dhaam facilitates the devotees for an overnight stay at the "Yatri Niwas" which can accommodate more than 90 people at a time. The Dham has won the National Tourism Awards 2010–11 under the category of "Most Innovative/Unique Tourism Project" by the Ministry of Tourism, Government of India.

A helipad is located 5 km from the town at an altitude of around 5000 ft. From here one can get the most panoramic view of Mt. Kanchendzonga along with other adjacent peaks, a part of Darjeeling, Kalimpong, and the rolling plains of Bengal.

Near the town, Sikkim's sole tea estate — the Temi Tea Garden is situated. The visitors can enjoy the scenic view of Temi tea garden - the one and the only tea estate in the state which produces top quality tea in the international market. The tea carries a premium the world over and costs around Rs. 800/- a kg. The tea is marked by its exotic odour and flavour. 

In the month of February, the Namchi garden hosts it annual flower show. The flower show is the largest in Sikkim, with flowers of vivid colours. The prime attraction of this show is the display of exotic and rare orchids.

One of the highlights of the town is the football stadium – the Bhaichung Stadium built by the Sikkimese government in honour of its most famous citizen, footballer Bhaichung Bhutia who owns a number of football schools all over India. "The Gold Cup" football tournament is held in Bhaichung Stadium almost every year. Football teams from all over India, Nepal, Bangladesh and Bhutan vie for the honour which draws lot of crowds from all over Sikkim. Namchi is also the base of the former chief minister of Sikkim, Pawan Kumar Chamling.

Historically, Namchi was the place where Pende Ongmoo, the treacherous princess who poisoned one of the Chogyals of Sikkim, was caught and killed for her deed. Legend says her spirit still haunts the foothills of Ghurpisey.

See also 
 Manjhitar
 Tribal Rain, a music band from Namchi

References

External links 

Cities and towns in Namchi district
Colossal statues in India